Liverpool Lime Street is a terminus railway station and the main station serving the city centre of Liverpool. Opened in August 1836, it is the oldest still-operating grand terminus mainline station in the world. A branch of the West Coast Main Line from London Euston terminates at the station, as does the original Liverpool and Manchester Railway. Journeys from Lime Street cover a wide range of destinations across England, Scotland and Wales.

Having realised that their existing Crown Street railway station was too far away from the city centre, the Liverpool and Manchester Railway commenced construction of the more central Lime Street station in October 1833. Designed by John Cunningham, Arthur Holme and John Foster Jr, it was officially opened in August 1836. Proving to be very popular with train commuters, expansion of the station had become necessary within six years of its opening. The first expansion, which was collaboratively produced by Joseph Locke, Richard Turner, William Fairbairn and John Kennedy, was completed in 1849 at a total cost of £15,000. During 1867, work upon a further expansion of Lime Street station commenced, during which time the present northern arched train shed was built. During 1879, a second parallel southern train shed was completed.

Following the nationalisation of the railways in 1948, Lime Street station was the subject of various upgrades and alterations, including new signalling systems in and around the station, a redeveloped concourse, and new retail and office spaces. In 1962, regular electric services between Lime Street and Crewe were officially started and, in 1966, the station hosted the launch of its first InterCity service, which saw the introduction of a regular  service between Liverpool and London. During the 1970s, a new urban rail network known as Merseyrail was developed, while all other long-distance terminal stations in Liverpool were closed, resulting in such services being centralised at Lime Street for the whole city. In October 2003, the Pendolino service operated by Virgin Trains West Coast was ceremonially unveiled at the station, introducing a faster service between Liverpool and London. In May 2015, the electrification of the former Liverpool and Manchester Railway route was completed, as well as the line to Wigan via St Helens Central.

Lime Street station is fronted by a large building designed in the Renaissance Revival style, the former North Western Hotel, which has since been converted to apartments. Since the 1970s, the main terminal building has also provided direct access to the underground Lime Street Wirral Line station on the Merseyrail network. Beginning in the 1960s, the Concourse House office tower block and several retailers stood outside the southern train shed, but they were demolished in 2010. Lime Street is the largest and oldest railway station in Liverpool; it is one of 18 stations managed by national infrastructure maintenance company Network Rail. During 2017, work commenced at Lime Street station on a £340 million remodelling programme. In Britain's 100 Best Railway Stations, written by columnist and editor Simon Jenkins, Lime Street Station was one of only ten stations to be awarded 5/5 stars.

History

Origins
The original terminus of the 1830 Liverpool and Manchester Railway (L&MR) was located at Crown Street, in Edge Hill, to the east of and outside the city centre. However, even before Edge Hill had been opened, it was apparent that there was a pressing need for another station to be built, which would this time be closer to the city centre. Accordingly, during October 1833, the construction commenced on a purpose-built station at Lime Street in the city centre; the land was purchased from Liverpool Corporation for £9,000. The means of connecting the new station to L&MR's network came in the form of a twin-track tunnel, which had been constructed between Edge Hill and the site of the new Lime Street station a year prior to work being started on the station itself; during the construction effort, the tunnel was frequently used to transport building materials for the station onto the site. The station was designed by the architects John Cunningham, Arthur Holme, and John Foster Jr.

During August 1836, Lime Street Station was officially opened to the public, although the construction process was not completed until the following year. This building was designed with four large gateways, two of which were intentionally nonfunctional. For its early operations, as a consequence of the steep incline uphill from Lime Street to Edge Hill, trains would be halted at Edge Hill and the locomotives detached from the trains; the practice of the era was for the passenger carriages to be taken down by gravity, during which the rate of descent would be controlled by brakemen located in a brake van. The return journey was achieved via the use of a stationary steam engine located at Edge Hill, which would be used to haul the carriages up to Edge Hill by rope. This system was constructed by the local engineering firm Mather, Dixon and Company, who worked under the direction of the engineer John Grantham. During 1870, this practice came to an end; instead, trains would enter and depart the station by conventional means.

Early expansion
Lime Street Station was a near-instant success with the railway-going public. Within six years of its opening, the rapid growth of the railways had necessitated the expansion of the original station. An early plan for the enlarged station would have involved the erection of an iron roof, similar to that found at Euston station (pre 1960's rebuilding) in London, which was a ridge roof supported by iron columns. However, a different proposal quickly gained the approval of the station committee. A single curved roof was produced by a collaborative effort; designed and load tested by engineer Joseph Locke, with construction contracted to iron founder Richard Turner, and the work checked by engineer William Fairbairn and manufacturer John Kennedy. The expansion work was performed at a cost of £15,000 and was completed during 1849, by which time the noted architect William Tite had also been involved. Meanwhile, during 1845, the L&MR had been absorbed by its principal business partner, the Grand Junction Railway (GJR); the following year the GJR became part of the London and North Western Railway. Amongst the features which date back to the 1846–1849 rebuild of the station are a group of four columns which adjoin former Platform 1, they have been attributed to engineer Edward Woods.

By 1857, a pair of granite columns had been erected outside the station entrance; over time, these had become known as the "Candlesticks". During 1867, further expansion of Lime Street Station was required to cope with operational demands; changes included the present northern arched train shed. It was also the first train shed in which iron was used throughout. During 1879, a second parallel southern train shed was completed, which had been designed by Stevenson and E.W. Ives. This second train shed featured dry construction techniques, while each bay reportedly took only three days to build.

Lime Street Station is fronted by a large building, built in the Renaissance Revival style, which formerly housed the North Western Hotel. Designed by Alfred Waterhouse, the building was built during 1871 and served as student accommodation for Liverpool John Moores University from 1996. It was announced on 28 September 2018 that the building will be restored as a hotel by the Marcus Worthington Group at a cost of £30m. It will reopen as the Radisson RED Liverpool Hotel in 2020.

As a result of the Railways Act 1921, which grouped the majority of railway companies together to create the Big Four, Lime Street Station passed into the ownership of the newly formed London, Midland and Scottish (LMS) railway. The station played an early role in the development of mail trains, the Post Office first dispatched mail by train from Lime Street.

British Rail era

Upon nationalisation of the railways during 1948, Lime Street Station became a part of the London Midland Region of British Railways. On 28 January 1948, a new signal box controlling movements in and around Lime Street was commissioned; this signal box would remain in use for almost 70 years, being one of the last lever frames boxes still in operation by the time of its decommissioning during 2017–2018. During 1955, the station concourse was redeveloped and modernised. During 1959, preparatory work commenced at Lime Street for the first stage of the electrification of the West Coast Main Line. On 1 January 1962, regular electric services between Lime Street and Crewe were officially started.

The railway lines to former platforms 10 and 11 were removed by 1965. On 18 April 1966, the station hosted the launch of its first InterCity service, which saw the introduction of a regular  service between Liverpool and London. Arriving back at Lime Street at 7:58 pm, this train marked the end of British Railways' final steam-hauled mainline passenger journey.

An office tower block named Concourse House, along with a row of small retail outlets, used to stand outside the southern train shed, obscuring the arches. These dated from the 1960s, and by the 2000s had become run down. They were demolished as part of a comprehensive refurbishment completed in 2010.

During the 1970s, a new urban rail network, known as Merseyrail was developed, resulting in four terminus stations being taken out of use in Liverpool and Birkenhead centres. As a consequence of this restructuring and rationalization, only Lime Street remained as a terminus, thus serving as a central point for the whole region for medium- and long-haul routes. At the same time, the Merseyrail network provided commuters with ease of access across the whole Merseyside region to the one remaining large terminus.

Between 1983 and 1984, the station concourse was again altered and refurbished at a total estimated cost of £7.4 million. This refurbishment included the construction of the black glass building which partially surrounds platforms inside the northern train shed, as well as the glass screen which separates the concourse from platforms inside the southern train shed. The alterations also coincided with the opening of the International Garden Festival. On 29 November 1984, the new development was officially opened by Princess Anne.

Privatisation era

On 20 October 2003, the new Pendolino service operated by private rail operator Virgin Trains, which introduced a faster service between Liverpool and London, was ceremonially unveiled in the presence of the company's founder and chief executive officer Richard Branson. Designed from the onset to be a tilting train, it quickly replaced much of the previously-allocated locomotives and rolling stock used on the West Coast Main Line, namely the British Rail Class 86, 87 and 90 electric locomotives and Mark 2 and Mark 3 coaching stock. Prior to this, the fleet had been first introduced into passenger services from Birmingham International to Manchester Piccadilly on 23 July 2002 to coincide with the opening of the 2002 Commonwealth Games in Manchester.

To help celebrate several high-profile occasions, such as Liverpool's role as European Capital of Culture during 2008, and the city's 800th anniversary in 2007, a £35 million redevelopment grant was issued for the station and its immediate surroundings. The Lime Street Gateway Project saw the demolition of the aging retail parade and office block located in front of the station, and an improved frontage and public plaza constructed in its place. Subsequently, Lime Street was voted Station of the Year 2010 at the National Rail Awards. The development was overseen by English Partnerships and was completed in October 2010.

The main concourse features a pair of statues of comedian Ken Dodd and politician Bessie Braddock, a work entitled "Chance Meeting" by sculptor Tom Murphy, which were unveiled by Ken Dodd himself during June 2009. On 31 August 2014, the Earl of Wessex unveiled a memorial to the Liverpool Pals at the station. The memorial, which comprises two bronze friezes, was also sculpted by Tom Murphy. During 2014, former Platforms 1–5 were fully refurbished by national rail infrastructure maintenance company Network Rail.

Electrification to Manchester and Wigan
Completion of electrification of the former Liverpool and Manchester Railway's route, and the line to Wigan via St Helens Central, during May 2015 led to a recast of timetables.

2017 wall collapse
At around 17:45 on 28 February 2017, the station was cut off after a wall collapsed into the cutting between Lime Street and Edge Hill, causing more than 200 tonnes of debris to fall onto all four of the tracks running into the throat of the station. While the line was blocked, Virgin trains terminated at Runcorn and other trains terminated at Liverpool South Parkway. The debris was cleared up, with repairs made to the overhead wires, and the station reopened just over a week later on 8 March 2017.

2017–18 station remodelling

During 2017, work commenced upon a £340 million remodelling programme intended to improve Lime Street Station by modernising its signalling systems, install new platforms, and other to better conform with current demands. A major impetus for the work was the age of the station's signalling, the core of which dated from the 1940s and was increasingly difficult to acquire knowledgeable staff for its operation and maintenance; furthermore, as resignalling of the existing station layout offered only slightly less work than the implementation of an entirely fresh layout, only without the benefits of being able to do so, it was decided to take the rare occasion as a convenient chance to make various alterations and improvements at the same time. Perhaps the most noticeable change made for the perspective of passengers was the creation of an additional pair of platforms, which were built in the large space available between Platforms 7 and 8 (now 6 and 9); all of the other platforms were also lengthened and widened as a part of this work.

According to industry publication Rail Engineer, the old layout of the station was relatively complex and posed some operational difficulties; many of the alterations sought to ease or eliminate some of these issues. As the curving of Platform 6 (now 5) had been a source of long-term driver difficulty in maintaining signal sightings, the platform was reprofiled to be straighter, permanently ending the problem. The new layout provides five platforms on each side of the station; beyond being simpler, the change facilitates the departure speed being increased from 15 to 25 mph and is also compatible with being maintained by modern mechanised equipment. In conjunction with the layout changes, new Mk3D overhead line equipment was installed along the route between Lime Street station and Edge Hill. Control of the signalling was transferred over to the centralised Manchester Rail Operating Centre.

The remodelling of Lime Street had been deemed necessary in order to provide the capacity for additional services to Glasgow, which are set to start during 2019. Various new retail outlets, along with a supermarket, were also established by work performed during the programme. To accommodate the work, the station was mostly closed over a twenty-three day period, which started on 30 September 2017; during the latter stages of this blockade, limited services ran to/from Huyton and some destinations beyond this. The station closed from 2 June 2018 to 29 July 2018 to allow more of the remodelling to be undertaken.

Station layout

Liverpool Lime Street is divided into two sections: the mainline station, which offers national inter-city and regional overground services including local City Line routes, and services on the Wirral Line on the Merseyrail network, located underground between the mainline station and St George's Hall.

Mainline station

The mainline station is covered by the vast iron and glass roofs dating from the 1870s. The north train shed is fronted by a 1871 French Château styled building occupied by the Radisson RED Liverpool Hotel. The hotel is scheduled to open in the first quarter of 2022.

Platforms 1 to 5 are shorter than 6 to 10, the latter dealing mainly with long-distance services to London, Birmingham, Leeds, Sheffield and Norwich. Access to platforms 1–5 is through a ticket inspection barrier similar to airport passport control, while former platform 7 was gated with the creation of new shops and facilities. Former Platforms 8 and 9 were still "open".

In 2009, new buildings were erected in the old "cab road" area between former platforms 7 and 8. Until the 2018 station remodelling, these housed customer lounges, the Virgin Trains customer service point, and an ATM, and there were retail units which had coffee shops amongst the units.

There were also four non-passenger tracks. Three of these were headshunts, created in the northern trainshed to turn locomotives around: Track A, in between former platforms 1 and 2; track B, serving former platforms 3 and 4; and track D, for former platforms 5 and 6. There is also a platform with no passenger service between former platforms 6 and 7, known as platform E, or sometimes affectionately as platform 6¾.

Facilities
Toilets, booking offices, shops, a left-luggage office, taxi ranks and coffee bars are amongst the facilities provided. The main booking office is operated by Northern Trains. The concourse of the station contains several shops, including branches of M&S Simply Food,  Starbucks, Upper Crust, Krispy Kreme, Costa Coffee, Boots and WHSmith. Car parking is managed by APCOA. The station also has two taxi ranks.

Public transport links
The station has direct bus services to the Liverpool One bus station on the 10A and 18 route, from the bus station for Liverpool John Lennon Airport use services 86A (frequent & night services) and 500. The bus services are provided by Arriva North West

Services
The main station is currently served by six train operating companies serving a wide variety of destinations. Services out of Lime Street are as follows:

East Midlands Railway
East Midlands Railway operate an hourly service to Norwich via Warrington Central, Manchester Piccadilly, Sheffield and Nottingham. Late afternoon and evening services terminate or start at Nottingham.

TransPennine Express
Additionally, there are two trains per day to  via the West Coast Main Line.

London Northwestern Railway

Northern
Northern is the main train operating company at Lime Street, operating the ticket office. Services include:
1 train per hour to  via ,  and 
1 train per hour to  via  (semi-fast to Warrington Central)
2 trains per hour to  via 

Avanti West Coast
Avanti West Coast operate an hourly Pendolino service to London Euston calling at Runcorn,  and Stafford (peak services call additionally at Lichfield Trent Valley, Tamworth, Nuneaton, Rugby, Milton Keynes Central and Watford Junction).

Transport for Wales
Transport for Wales operate a two-hourly service to Chester via Runcorn, using the Halton Curve with occasional extensions to Wrexham General.

Service summary

Proposed services

CrossCountry Trains Consultation 2018

The Department for Transport's 2018 consultation on the future of the CrossCountry franchise, which was due for renewal in 2019 but was later cancelled in September 2018 but cited Liverpool as a potential new destination for CrossCountry train service. If adopted this may restore some of the services lost in 2003. The Consultation closed in August 2018. Despite the cancellation of the competition, the consultation responses will be used to help develop options for the future of the franchise so Liverpool may be considered as a potential destination in the future.

Long Term Rail Strategy Proposals

In a long term rail strategy by Merseytravel, new direct services to Cardiff, Bristol, Leicester, Derby, Glasgow Central and Edinburgh Waverley have been proposed.

Virgin Trains Open Access Proposal

West Coast Partnership

In August 2019, it was announced that Avanti West Coast would operate the West Coast Partnership franchise from December 2019.

Future Northern and TransPennine Franchises

In November 2018, it was revealed by Transport for the North several options for the future Northern and TransPennine franchise. Some options for Liverpool include extension of Liverpool to Crewe services towards Stoke-on-Trent and Alsager, increasing Liverpool to Blackpool North services and a new Liverpool to Leicester service via Crewe, Stoke-on-Trent, Uttoxeter and Derby. The Leicester service could be operated by either TransPennine Express or the future East Midlands Franchise.

TransPennine Franchise Agreement
As part of the TransPennine Express (TPE) franchise agreement (awarded to FirstGroup which started services in April 2016), there will be three new direct services per day to Glasgow Central via Preston along the West Coast main line.  The current hourly TPE Newcastle route was extended via  to Edinburgh Waverley in December 2019.

In 2005 Renaissance Trains proposed a twice-daily service from Lime Street to Glasgow Central, with weekend trains running instead from Blackpool to Glasgow. The proposal did not get enough investment backing, but was revived in 2014.

Chester, Wales and Shrewsbury via the Halton Curve
The completion of the upgrade of the Halton Curve in 2018 provides a second rail route between Liverpool and Chester, and permits the introduction of new direct services from Liverpool to Wrexham, Llandudno and other parts of North Wales. 
As part of the new Wales & Borders franchise services to Chester were  introduced in May 2019 with future services to Llandudno and Shrewsbury every hour and services to Cardiff every two hours planned.

London Euston
It was also proposed by 2016 that London Midland will also operate an hourly service to London Euston (as an extension of its existing Trent Valley semi-fast service), however, this was rejected by the Office of Rail Regulation. . From May 2019, its successor London Northwestern Railway operates a London to Liverpool service via Birmingham New Street.

Northern Franchise Agreement
As part of the Northern franchise agreement (awarded to Arriva, which started in April 2016), from December 2019 there will be a new "Northern Connect" service to Leeds via Manchester Victoria and Bradford Interchange (replacing the current all-stations local service to Victoria). This is the first time there is a direct service through to Rochdale, Halifax and Bradford Interchange since the timetable change on 10 December 2006 when Northern terminated all services at Manchester Victoria.

Underground station

The underground station consists of a single platform (sometimes referred to as Platform L),  alongside the 1970s Liverpool Loop tunnel and a ticket hall above. The station, opened in 1977, is connected to the mainline station by means of a pedestrian subway and escalators, accessed via a long passageway which crosses beneath Lime Street itself, and by a lift from the main concourse.

2013 refurbishment
Network Rail announced in early 2013 that Lime Street was to be the third station to be refurbished as part of the £40 million investment which would see all Merseyrail underground stations excluding Conway Park refurbished. This included the refurbishment of the platform and the booking hall. The station refurbishment work took place between April and August 2013.

Subway refurbishment
The subway linking the underground station to the mainline station was refurbished in June 2014. The subway was fitted out with new tiles, lighting, flooring and automatic doors to some of the entrances.

Recent history
The underground station had WiFi installed in January 2016.

In March 2016, it was announced that the Wirral Line loop would be having its track renewed. The underground station was closed between 3 January 2017 and 18 June 2017 whilst the works took place.

Services
Services operate on a 5-minute frequency Monday-Saturday, and between 5- and 10-minute frequency on Sundays in the winter. All trains travel through to Liverpool Central and Birkenhead of which:

4 trains per hour continue to New Brighton
4 trains per hour continue to West Kirby
4 trains per hour continue to Chester
2 trains per hour continue to Ellesmere Port

To reach destinations on the Northern Line of the network, passengers must either use the Wirral Line and change at Liverpool Central station or walk the short distance to the station.

Filmography 
Lime Street Station was used as a location in the 2019 film Yesterday.

Notes

References

Citations

Bibliography

Further reading

 One of the volumes contains a track diagram of the station around 1912. This includes the earlier signal box, in between the tracks at the station throat, the locomotive turntables on either side of the station throat and, on the north side of the station, the goods yard with wagon turntables.

External links

 Station information for Liverpool Lime Street from National Rail

Grade II listed buildings in Liverpool
Grade II listed railway stations
Lime Street
Liverpool Lime Street
Railway stations in Liverpool
Former London and North Western Railway stations
Railway stations in Great Britain opened in 1836
Railway stations opened by British Rail 
Railway stations in Great Britain opened in 1977 
Railway stations served by East Midlands Railway
Railway stations served by TransPennine Express
Railway stations served by West Midlands Trains
Northern franchise railway stations
Railway stations served by Avanti West Coast
Railway stations served by Merseyrail
DfT Category A stations 
DfT Category D stations 
Lime Street Gateway
John Cunningham railway stations
Railway stations served by Transport for Wales Rail
Stations on the West Coast Main Line